Nadia Daam (born 1978) is a French journalist.

Life 
Brought up in Strasbourg to a jewish-maroccoan family, Daam obtained a Baccalauréat in 1996 at the International School of Pontonniers. She studied at Lycée Victor-Hugo in Paris, she also obtained a bachelor of performance art, at La Sorbonne Nouvelle Paris 3.

She started to work for the newspaper Libération in 2000. For two years she was in charge of personal ads. In 2008, she published the essay Mauvaises mères! and became a columnist at Les Maternelles on France 5. Subsequently, she collaborated with Slate, Arte (a 28-minute show) and Europe 1, among others.

Controversy of 2017 

In October 2017, Clara Gonzales and Elliot Lepers, two feminist activists were victims of harassment calls by writers of the forum "Blabla 18–25 ans" of the website Jeuxvideo.com, following the creation of an emergency number allowing women to give a phone number when a stalker asks them. Messages were sent to their numbers from mobile apps. They have since been the subject of cyberbullying on Twitter and the number has harassed people making themselves vulnerable . The public's reaction to the controversy caused an influx of complaint number calls, the director of Jeuxvideo.com, Cédric Page, condemned "these actions" while defending the forum, saying that "it is simply the expression of this generation". The forum was regularly blamed for propagating hate speech and otherwise known according to the newspaper Libération to be a scaremonger for anti-feminist activists.

On 1 November 2017, Daam talked about a chronicle on Europe 1, and attacked the forum 18–25, calling it among other things "non-recyclable trash". She started an anti-harassment rally to boost solidarity for media corporations. A petition, signed by a hundred journalists, completely agreed with her, designating members of the forum as "cowardly, shabby and despicable beings", calling "the police and the community of the web" to prevent them doing further harm. Secretary of State for Equality between Women and Men Marlène Schiappa also called Twitter and Webedia, the company owning jeuxvideo.com. Europe 1 radio reported that it had filed a complaint about the threat of violence against people. The owner of Webedia said that "the topics evoking this Nadia Daam were systematically erased as a preventative measure".

References

External links 

1978 births
Living people
French women journalists
French people of Moroccan descent
French television journalists
Writers from Strasbourg